State Highway 115 (SH 115) is a state highway in the U.S. state of Texas that runs from Interstate 20 in Pyote to SH 349 at Patricia.

Route description
SH 115 begins at an intersection with Interstate 20 and Farm to Market Road 1927 in Pyote.  The route travels north along the eastern edge of town and through Far West Texas oil fields before reaching Wink.  The route then turns northeast, next reaching Kermit.  The route travels through downtown Kermit, passing the Winkler County Courthouse.  The route continues to the northeast, crossing oil fields of Winkler and Andrews Counties, before reaching Andrews.  The route travels through Andrews, intersecting U.S. Route 385.  The route continues northeast, crossing through the intersection of Andrews, Gaines, Martin, and Dawson Counties before reaching its terminus at SH 349 at the unincorporated community of Patricia, Texas.

History
 SH 115 was originally proposed on July 13, 1926 as a route from north of Amarillo to Stratford into Oklahoma. On December 2, 1931, this route became an extension of SH 9. On June 2, 1932, SH 115 was redesignated on a new route as a short route between Pyote through Wink to Kermit.  On October 21, 1952, an extension of SH 115 along FM 703 was signed, but not designated. The extension was officially designated on August 29, 1990, replacing FM 703.

Major intersections

References

Transportation in Ward County, Texas
Transportation in Winkler County, Texas
Transportation in Andrews County, Texas
Transportation in Martin County, Texas
Transportation in Gaines County, Texas
Transportation in Dawson County, Texas
115